Canon's Town or Canonstown (Ordnance Survey) is a hamlet in west Cornwall, England, UK, situated on the A30 road in the civil parish of Ludgvan, between Penzance and Hayle. It is southwest of St Erth railway station. It is in the civil parish of St Erth

References

Hamlets in Cornwall
Penwith